Gustav Putzendopler (16 January 1894; – 20 November 1969) was an Austrian international footballer who played for SK Rapid Wien, FC Basel and FC Mulhouse. He played in the position as midfielder.

Football career
Putzendopler started his youth football and his football career by Rapid Wien. Between the years 1912 and 1920 he played a total of 49 games in the Austrian Championship and numerous test matches for Rapid without scoring a goal. During the 1919/20 season Putzendopler played two games for the national team of Austria.

During 1920 he and his brother Karl Putzendopler moved to Switzerland to find work. Both had suffered due to the First World War, in fact Gustav had been held captured by the Russians for over 40 months. The brothers had completed an apprenticeship in Galvanoplastic and after the War both were unable to find an occupation in their home country. In Basel they both found work and both joined FC Basel and settled in quickly, they played regularly. 

A note to an outrage and scandal after the 8th round match at the Landhof on 12 November 1922 against BSC Young Boys. It came to spme massive disagreements between Basel manager Breunig's co-trainer Mr Sutter, the players of both teams and some fans. The Swiss Football Association started an enquiry immediately and postponed the match Basel against Luzern from 3 December 1922 to 18 February the following year. After an appeal the results of the enquiry ended with following decision: The club Basel was fined 200 Swiss Francs, co-trainer Mr Sutter was banned for three years, Basel's player Gustav Putzendopler was banned from playing for six months, Young Boy's players Osterwalder and von Arx were both fined 20 Swiss Francs, Referee Josef Wieland received a life long ban from the top tier of Swiss football.

Between the years 1920 and 1927 Gustav Putzendopler played a total of 175 games for Basel, scoring a total of seven goals. 95 of these games were in the Swiss Serie A, three in the Swiss Cup and 77 were friendly games. He scored three goals in the domestic league, the other four were scored during the test games.

For the 1927/28 season Putzendopler transferred to FC Mulhouse as player-manager. For the 1930/31 season he returned to FC Basel as first team manager.

References

Sources
 Rotblau: Jahrbuch Saison 2017/2018. Publisher: FC Basel Marketing AG. 
 Die ersten 125 Jahre. Publisher: Josef Zindel im Friedrich Reinhardt Verlag, Basel. 
 Verein "Basler Fussballarchiv" Homepage

SK Rapid Wien players
Austrian footballers
Austria international footballers
FC Basel players
Association football midfielders
1894 births
1969 deaths